is an area in Yodogawa-ku in north central Osaka, Japan.  

The core of the area is Jūsō Station, the hub station of the Hankyu Railway system.  The area typifies the unique culture of Osaka. Situated across the Yodo River from central Osaka, Jūsō is centrally located for easy access by Hankyu Railway lines to other major Kansai cities: 24 minutes to Kobe (Kobe-Sannomiya Station) to the west and 40 minutes to Kyoto (Kawaramachi Station) to the northeast.

Predominantly known as the pink area of Osaka, Jūsō has a robust red light district area in the Hommachi West area.  

Jūsō is also famous for its wide variety of high quality classic Osaka cuisine featuring okonomiyaki, negiyaki, and takoyaki shops.

In August every year, a massive fireworks celebration takes place beside the Yodo River; the people who attend this celebration often wear traditional yukatas and wooden sandals.

Notable people from Jūsō
 Yukari Taki, Japanese actress and tarento

History

The name Jūsō is written with the kanji for "thirteen." One theory as the origin of the name states that it was originally the thirteenth stop on the Yodo River going from Kyoto to Osaka Bay. A less popular theory holds that the name originated in numbering under the old  land allocation system. 

Jūsō Station opened in 1910 as a stop on the Minoo-Arima Electric Railway (now the Hankyu Takarazuka Line).

The area became part of Osaka City in 1925. The Osaka government constructed the Juso Bridge across the Yodogawa River in 1932.

Steven Seagal's aikido dojo, Tenshin Aikido, opened in Juso in 1975 and was the first dojo operated by a foreigner in Japan.

Juso was one of the Osaka locations used in the 1989 Ridley Scott film Black Rain: in the scene shot in Juso, Michael Douglas and Andy Garcia are surrounded by a biker gang while walking to their hotel after dinner in Dōtonbori (despite the fact that Juso and Dotonbori are about seven kilometers apart).

References

Geography of Osaka
Red-light districts in Japan
Tourist attractions in Osaka